Nebu is the Egyptian symbol for gold. It depicts a golden collar with the ends hanging off the sides and seven spines dangling from the middle.

Ancient Egyptians believed that gold was an indestructible and heavenly metal. The sun god, Ra, was often referred to as a mountain of gold. The Royal Tomb was known as the "House of Gold". The pharaohs of the Old Kingdom were called the "Golden Horus".
In Middle Egyptian, the hieroglyph for nebu is S12 It was sometimes followed by the goddess determinative: I12 - this changed its meaning to "the Golden One", an epithet of Hathor.
The ancient Egyptian name for the city of Ombos, Nebet, also used the nebu hieroglyph.

References

Gold (nebu), egyptianmyths.net
Egyptian Gold, aldokkan.com

Egyptian mythology
Gold
Religious symbols
Hathor